Tecmo Classic Arcade is a collection of classic Tecmo arcade games for the Microsoft Xbox. This collection was released on September 13, 2005 in the U.S., October 21, 2005 in Europe and October 27, 2005 in Japan, and contains all of the games that Tecmo Hit Parade (a similar collection released on the PlayStation 2 exclusively in Japan) includes along with four more games. This game was published and developed by Tecmo.

Games
There are 11 games in this collection. Games that are not in the original Tecmo Hit Parade are marked by an asterisk.

Bomb Jack
Pinball Action
Pleiads
Rygar*
Senjyo
Solomon's Key
Star Force
Strato Fighter*
Swimmer*
Tecmo Bowl*
Tecmo Cup

Reception
Tecmo Classic Arcade scored fairly low due to the lack of the more important Tecmo games. IGN scored the game a 4.8/10 saying that it doesn't have enough games, lacks fun, and costs more than other classic arcade collections. GameSpot scored the game a 6/10 saying that the emulation is accurate but many of the titles aren't worth playing.

References

2005 video games
Xbox games
Xbox-only games
Tecmo games
Video game compilations
Video games developed in Japan
Multiplayer and single-player video games